Miccolamia glabricula is a species of beetle in the family Cerambycidae. It was described by Henry Walter Bates in 1884.

Subspecies
 Miccolamia glabricula glabricula Bates, 1884
 Miccolamia glabricula sadoensis Hasegawa & N. Ohbayashi, 2001

References

Desmiphorini
Beetles described in 1884